Ali Mills is a fictional character portrayed by Elisabeth Shue in the film The Karate Kid (1984), and in the third season of its sequel series Cobra Kai (2021).

Overview

Background
Ali Mills grew up in a wealthy family in Encino, Los Angeles. During high school in the early 1980s, she was a cheerleader who enjoyed playing games at a local Arcade. She also dated rich-kid Johnny until they broke up in 1984. A few weeks after the breakup, she began to date Daniel who had just moved to Reseda, until they broke up after the Senior Prom in 1985. She was later a student at UCLA and then in medical school. She became a pediatric surgeon, and settled in Denver, Colorado with her husband and her two children.

In December 2018, she returned home and had a short reunion with Johnny, and later Daniel, revealing that she is currently in the process of divorcing her husband, Dr. Gregory Schwarber (an oncologist whom she met in medical school). She reveals to Johnny that her parents are not happy about the upcoming divorce.
After the divorce, she ended up marrying Johnny, because her parents said that if she was to divorce Dr. Gregory Schwarber, then she would still have to marry someone “suitable” like Johnny.

Young Ali Mills

Daniel and Johnny
In Season 1, Episode 1 of Cobra Kai, Johnny Lawrence and Daniel LaRusso meet accidentally after Johnny's car is towed to Daniel's auto business, 34 years after the events of The Karate Kid. Prosperous and successful Daniel appears happy to see him, while Johnny (who was just fired from his construction job and is living in a small apartment in Reseda, California) is very uncomfortable. Daniel introduces Johnny to his employees as a "guy who really had it in for me" when they were in high school. Johnny replies that he behaved that way because Daniel "move[d] in on my girl", referring to the fact that he and Ali had dated before she met Daniel. In response, Daniel asks "She actually wasn't really your girl anymore, was she?", as Ali and Johnny had broken up a few weeks before Daniel met her at the beach.

High school relationship and breakup with Johnny
Johnny (in Cobra Kai) describes both his relationship with Ali and their 1984 breakup (events alluded to but not shown in The Karate Kid). In Season 1, Episode 8 of Cobra Kai, Johnny tells his student Miguel that he first met Ali in the Summer of 1982, when he and his Cobra Kai friends went to see the movie Rocky III. They noticed a group of girls in front of them and one of his friends, Dutch, began to throw Milk Duds at them. When Miguel is surprised, Johnny explains that it was an "alpha move", because girls like guys who "treat them like crap". The girls became angry and one of them - Ali - got up and began yelling at Dutch, pouring her popcorn (with butter) all over him. Johnny said that was the first time he met Ali, and thought that she was a "firecracker". After turning him down many times, Ali finally said yes to a date. He took her to "Golf N' Stuff", where they kissed on the Ferris wheel. Johnny said that they were "madly in love" and dated for two years. She gave Johnny the black headband he wears during Karate. However, the summer before senior year, they had a big fight. While he thought they would "work things out", Ali met Daniel instead, believing that she had cheated on him (when they were simply just friends). 

In Season 2, Episode 5 of Cobra Kai, Johnny makes a confession about his breakup with Ali to Tommy (who he helped to sneak out of the hospital for a 24-hour road trip). Johnny states that on the night that Dutch got so drunk that he smashed a dart board, he also got so drunk that he missed Ali's birthday - ultimately leading up to the "big fight" that ended their relationship. Later that evening, Tommy also makes a confession. He said that he was also in love with Ali (whom he met in Homeroom during Freshman year) but never had the courage to ask her out. After Johnny began dating her, Tommy said was inspired to become a Cobra Kai so that he could gain Johnny's courage, although he got over Ali as he did not wish to have her come between him and a fellow Cobra. Johnny responded by saying that he never got over Ali, though he dated many women after her. Ali was the only one with whom Johnny was able to "let his guard down".

In Season 3, Episode 9 of Cobra Kai, Johnny and Ali reunite after he finds her on Facebook. After realizing that they haven't seen each other since he lost the tournament (The Karate Kid), they catch up on the past three decades. Johnny apologizes to her for the mistakes he made while they were dating. Ali tells him that she can't even remember why they were angry with each other.

High school relationship and breakup with Daniel
Ali first notices Daniel at a beach party the summer before senior year of high school (The Karate Kid). Daniel's friends tell him that she is "off-limits" by his friends because she is part of the rich clique. They inevitably meet when he teaches her a few soccer moves. Johnny is infuriated when he sees her with Daniel (although Ali ended the relationship a few weeks prior, he did not believe it was over) and races his motorcycle into their conversation. Despite repeatedly telling him to leave her alone, Johnny continues to insist she talk with him. Daniel tries to stick up for Ali and is badly beaten by Johnny, who is experienced in karate. Ali attempts to help him, but he pushes her away.

Daniel and Ali meet the next day at their high school on the soccer field as she prepares to attend cheerleading practice. It is during this conversation that she introduces herself as "Ali — with an ‘i’", to which he responds that he is "Daniel — with an ‘l’". While practicing with her teammates, she even looks on in concern as he gets kicked out of soccer practice for getting into yet another fight with Johnny's friends for tripping him. As they continue to get to know each other, Daniel discovers that Johnny is Ali's ex-boyfriend (as of 3 weeks). As her interest in Daniel deepens, Ali encourages him to stand up to Johnny, whom she feels is a bully and realizes is frequently beating Daniel up. She tells Daniel that "It's just that he [Johnny] thinks he can do whatever he wants to people". She also tells Daniel that she would "love to see him [Johnny] get a dose of his own medicine". Unfazed by Johnny's outbursts, she frequently tells him off or yells at him, and is angry that he will not leave her alone.

Ali's down-to-earth nature is highlighted during her first date with Daniel, when she is picked up by Daniel's mother Lucille in an old car that stalls. Not only does Ali immediately get along with Lucille, but willingly helps Lucille and Daniel start the car up again. This interaction is a stark contrast with Ali's parents who interrogate Daniel when they meet him and are not impressed that he lives in Reseda rather than Encino. This difference in social class is further emphasized at the end of the date, when Daniel is teased by other teenagers because he is picked up by his mother in their old car (an incident that bothers him more than Ali).

Social class is further reinforced when Ali asks Daniel to meet her after dinner with her parents at an elite country club. Johnny, also at the club, tries to get her attention and is aided by Ali's parents (who prefer Johnny to Daniel). Ali, however, is hostile after she is coerced to dance with Johnny by her mother, and hits him in the face when he forces her to kiss him (a move he made to infuriate Daniel who was watching in the kitchen). She yells at Johnny, "Don't you ever do that to me again!" and storms away. Daniel also tries to run away but gets spaghetti spilled on himself after he accidentally crashes into the kitchen staff.

A few days later, equipped with a driver's license and a car from Mr. Miyagi, Daniel finds Ali at the Arcade, and they argue (as Daniel is angry over the kiss he witnessed and Ali is angry about the entire incident). Daniel accuses her of being a snob who is behaving badly because he isn't "rich with a fancy car". This statement infuriates Ali, as it contradicts her real nature, which she summarizes by telling him: "You know, Daniel, I didn't go out with you because of a car or where you live ... I thought maybe you were different". She makes him understand that the discomfort with the class differences between them comes from him and not from her. Daniel also learns that Ali rejected Johnny's kiss, after her friend tells him that Ali punched Johnny with "her right hook- you think she sprained her wrist doing her nails?" Daniel apologizes, and Ali agrees to support him at the tournament against Johnny the next day.

Ali arrives at the tournament with Daniel and Mr. Miyagi, and tells the officials that she needs to be at the ringside because she is Mr. Miyagi's translator. Since neither Daniel nor Miyagi know the actual rules of competitive karate, Ali quickly teaches Daniel what he needs to know before the competition begins. Daniel eventually proceeds to the finals and defeats Johnny. Ali rushes to hug Daniel afterward as they celebrate his victory. 

They broke up six months later, however, with each character offering different reasons for the breakup.

Daniel's version of the breakup:
In 1985, Daniel offers his version at the beginning of The Karate Kid Part II. He returns to Mr. Miyagi's home from the Prom in the now badly beaten up car that Mr. Miyagi gave to him. As he enters the house, Mr. Miyagi says to him that it "must have been some senior prom; what happened?" In response, Daniel exclaims angrily, "You mean, what didn't happen? First I let Ali borrow the car and she redesigns my fender! And I don't know what she did with the engine, but that ain't running right either. And you know what else she does? She tells me that she's just fallen in love with some football player from UCLA! Why didn't she just lie?"

Ali's version of the breakup:
A few decades later in December 2018, Ali offers her version of the breakup during Episode 10, Cobra Kai (season 3). Ali and Johnny reconnect via Facebook, and spend a day together. They later attend a holiday party, where Ali meets Daniel and his wife Amanda. Ali, Johnny, Daniel, and Amanda then have dinner together, and Ali offers her version of their mutual experiences during high school. Amanda and Johnny are both interested in knowing the facts behind Ali and Daniel's breakup. Ali clarifies that it had nothing to do with Johnny saying that instead, she "got into UCLA, and I ran into this guy that I knew who went there. Daniel sees me talking to my friend..." At this moment, Daniel interrupts Ali and sarcastically repeats the phrase, "your friend" (with air quotes). Ali then tells him, "yes he was my friend, actually." She then points to Daniel and says that, "he jumps to conclusions. Well, I was a little bit upset so I probably, maybe, egged you on." Daniel becomes defensive, and tells Ali that he thought she was "in love with the guy." Ali then says to him, "I told you! Just like I told you that the brakes on Mr. Miyagi's car were gonna go! I hope that you didn't tell him that it was my fault it crashed?" Ashamed, Daniel lies, saying, "No, of course not." 

Later, as he is leaving, Daniel apologizes to Ali for the manner of their breakup. Ali responds by saying that they were both very young, and instead will focus on remembering the good times that they shared together.

Adult Ali Mills

Season 1

Episode 9
Johnny and Daniel end up in a bar and begin to talk about their shared childhood over drinks. Daniel reveals to Johnny that Ali is currently a pediatric surgeon who has since moved to Denver with her husband Gregory Schwarber, an oncologist whom she met in med school. Daniel says he has not spoken to Ali since 1985, which Johnny thinks is odd because Daniel knows so much about a woman he has not seen or spoken to in decades. Daniel says he learned of her from his Facebook account, and learns that Johnny has no idea what Facebook is. Daniel opens up Facebook, explains how it works to Johnny, and shows him Ali's account. It displays her name as Ali Mills Schwarber and shows a picture of Dr. Schwarber (whom Daniel and Johnny agree is a "pretty boy"). Daniel mentions that he did not send her a friend request, as he believes Amanda would frown on him reconnecting with ex-girlfriends, and does not see a purpose in doing so in the first place.

Season 2

Episode 8
One night while drinking in a bar, Johnny (who has since learned about Facebook and set up an account) types a Facebook message to Ali, which he hesitates to send. He only sends the message accidentally (and without his knowledge) after someone bumps into him, forcing him to press the "send" button.

Episode 10
After losing the Cobra Kai dojo to Kreese (who had a talk with the landlord, and finds out that the landlord doesn't like Johnny), and seeing his unconscious neighbor and star student Miguel Diaz on life support due to Miguel's spinal injuries accidentally caused by his estranged son Robby Keene at the end of the school fight, Johnny drives to the beach and throws his smart phone away into the sand in a fit of rage. He is thus unaware that Ali has sent him a Facebook "friend request" in response to the Facebook message he had unknowingly sent earlier.

Season 3

Episode 5
Miguel takes pictures of himself and Johnny at a concert and tells Johnny that he can see them on Facebook. When Johnny tells Miguel that he doesn't have Facebook anymore because he threw his phone away, Miguel explains to him that he can access Facebook through his computer. Later, while working on his laptop, Johnny opens up Facebook to look at the concert photos and finally sees Ali's "friend request", which he accepts.

Episode 6
After Johnny accepts her Facebook "friend request", Ali sends him a message via Facebook Messenger. She notes that a lot of time has passed since high school, and says that she is happy with her family and career, and could "still kick your ass at air hockey". Ali also says that while they used to see each other every day in high school, she doesn't know anything about what he is like now and wonders what he is up to.

Johnny initially composes a novel-length response in "all caps" (after "liking" all of her photos), a response which sends Miguel into a panic. He asks Johnny for photos so that they can develop a better Facebook Profile. After looking through Johnny's box of 1980's "pin-up" style photos of himself, Miguel decides that they should take contemporary pictures, and Johnny decides to base them on the kind of photos that Ali posts. Ultimately, however, Johnny posts pictures of himself with his karate students.

Episode 9
Ali is visiting her parents for the holidays, and her mother asks her to attend the Christmas party, which Ali agrees to do. She had also responded to Johnny's Facebook message with a note that says she is in town and that they should meet for lunch. During the lunch, they realize they had not seen each other since Johnny’s defeat at the karate tournament (at the end of The Karate Kid). 

Johnny confesses to Ali that he wasted his life, first during his 20s and 30s partying too much, and then after his girlfriend at the time became pregnant, he was unable to cope with being a father. Ali also confesses that she has "messed up" many things in her life, because she was always playing a series of roles: "Ali the Good Doctor, Ali the Good Mom, Ali the Good Wife". Next she states that she and her husband are separated and are divorcing each other. Johnny apologizes for his behavior in high school, and for the mistakes that he made in their relationship.

They next hang out at "Golf and Stuff", take selfies, discuss about their children and nearly kiss. However, Ali receives a phone call from her mother reminding her about the Christmas party, and she invites Johnny to join her. When Johnny arrives at the party at the country club, he sees Ali talking to Daniel.

Episode 10

While Daniel is ordering drinks at the Christmas party he hears a voice saying, "Daniel — with an ‘l’". Daniel turns to see Ali, whom he hasn't seen since high school. They joke that it’s funny to run into each other at the same country club that Daniel (the "kid from Reseda") was forced out of when he came to find Ali, and hug. At that moment, Johnny enters and almost has an accident with a waiter carrying bowls of spaghetti (all references to similar events in reverse in The Karate Kid). 

Unaware that Daniel and Johnny had been in touch, Ali "reunites" them, but is soon witness to their continued rivalry. She meets Amanda, who somewhat sarcastically tells Ali about the "karate wars" between Daniel and Johnny. They bond over their mutual amusement over how absurd it seems.

Ali, Johnny, and Daniel then tell stories of high school. During this time, Ali reveals that what actually caused her breakup with Daniel was his jealousy over a college friend of hers (which Daniel mistook for a love affair). Ali also reveals that she did not crash Daniel's car, but instead that the brakes had gone out, something that Ali had tried to warn Daniel would happen. While Amanda is paying for dinner, Ali lectures Daniel and Johnny on their behavior by pointing out that they both share much more in common than they like to think. Ashamed, Daniel and Johnny both agree that they are at fault, and will try harder. Daniel again apologizes to Ali for the mistakes of the past as he says goodbye, and she tells him that she tends to only think of the good things.

Next, she says goodbye to Johnny. They talk about his relationship with Carmen (which Amanda told Ali about), and how happy she is for him. As an act of closure, she tells him that it's good to visit the past, to know where you are now, but has to move forward. Johnny agrees, saying that "we have to live for today" and Ali adds "and the future, whatever that might bring". Ali tells Johnny that she has faith in him and "will always be there for him". She pushes him towards his car saying, "So get out of here, you have a future to find". Johnny agrees and leaves to find Carmen, while Ali returns to the country club to find her parents.

Commentary
Elisabeth Shue attended Wellesley College. She transferred to Harvard University in 1984, from which she withdrew to pursue her acting career (she was inspired by a friend to work in television commercials as a way to pay for college) one semester short of earning her degree (she eventually graduated in 2000). It was during this time that she auditioned for the part of Ali in The Karate Kid. Among the younger cast members, Shue remembers Ralph Macchio [Daniel] as someone who was considered "a big star compared to the rest of us. We were all like: Woah, he has a manager". Shue also recalls "being incredibly jealous that Ralph got to learn karate and I didn't. I made fun of him a little bit, like: I could kick your ass". In contrast, Shue was put through a different kind of physical conditioning for the beach scene: "I remember having to wear a bathing suit for that scene, which was a big deal because I felt so uncomfortable. When we first started filming, I was given a trainer (Jake Steinfeld, of Body by Jake fame) and asked to stay in shape". 

36 years after the original film, Shue returned to the franchise during the final two episodes of Cobra Kai, Season 3 (although characters referred to her in Seasons 1 and 2). In 2019, Shue stated that "in Karate Kid 2, my character was kind of pushed aside in a way that didn’t feel so great. So it’s funny how the idea of Ali coming back [started]...at first, I thought, ‘Well, her character really left the world of The Karate Kid in a way that wasn’t so great...would people care about her coming back?’” She ultimately joined Cobra Kai due to the encouragement from director, Dan Trachtenberg. She also decided to return because the writers planned to contest Daniel's version of the breakup in The Karate Kid II. Heald, Hurwitz, and Schlossberg stated that they "didn't like [Daniel's reason]. Elisabeth didn't like that reason. So we tried to think of a way to make a way that didn't make Daniel out to be a liar but also gave Ali her own side of the story". Hurwitz also added that "hearing what happened at the start of that movie was such a bummer for us ... so we knew when we brought her on the show we would find a way to explain and get her side of the story". In addition, in chapter three of his 2022 memoir onWaxing On: The Karate Kid and Me, Ralph Macchio explores both Daniel's version of the breakup and his own personal lack of awareness at the time of the impact it had on Shue. He adds in an interview given after the release of the memoir that he "never looked at it from the perspective of Ali’s character or from the perspective of Elisabeth as an actor...as an older person, there was a recognition of missteps, of things I should have done differently." He also acknowledged that at that time, "women in movies were often thought to be disposable...I see that now. Then? I didn’t see it. It was a case of youth being wasted on the young. I was swept up in everything that was happening in my life."

Shue enjoyed her experience in Cobra Kai, stating that it was "like the movie never stopped... It just felt like our chemistry and our connections were exactly the same as they were". Zabka concurred noting that, "I think I lived everybody's fantasy of being Daniel LaRusso at Golf N' Stuff with Ali Mills on his arm … to kind of recreate those moments was so much fun and we just laughed the whole time. She's awesome, Elisabeth. We were good friends when we made [1984's The Karate Kid] and lost touch over the years. But it was just an instant chemistry". Macchio enjoyed the sense of closure that the reunion brought, such as the "moment where I come back and I want to apologize for years back and she cuts me off. When I turn to leave, it's such a genuine moment on her face and they put the Karate Kid little love story music under it, and it just really was an 'awww' moment for me. It sort of tied it up. I didn't know it when we shot it because I'm leaving and it was me turning away, and you just stay on her for that moment and there was a whole story in her eyes there that I thought really captured the heart of that sweet little adolescent romance from 36 years ago".

References

External links
Karate Kid: Ali and Daniel audition, 1983
Karate Kid: Ali and Daniel rehearsal (same scene), 1983
Karate Kid: Daniel Defends Ali Scene
Karate Kid: Daniel and Ali's First Date Scene
Cobra Kai, Season 3: Daniel, Johnny & Ali Reunion Scene 

Film characters introduced in 1984
The Karate Kid (franchise) characters
Female characters in film
Fictional female doctors
Fictional cheerleaders
Fictional pediatricians
Fictional pediatric surgeons
Teenage characters in film